Naughty Boy is a 1962 Indian romantic comedy film, starring Kishore Kumar and Kalpana Mohan. It was produced and directed by Shakti Samanta. The music was composed by S. D. Burman and he was assisted by his own son R. D. Burman. Dialogues were written by Vrajendra Gaur.

Due to the popularity of them as couple, Madhubala and Kishore Kumar were initially cast in the film. However, director Samanta replaced Madhubala with Mohan due to her illness and poor health condition.

Plot

Pritam works as a Book-keeper in an Export Import Firm and does not have a roof to live under. When he goes to search for accommodation, he runs into a friend, Jagdish, who takes him to a rooming house and lets him share one room with himself, Kavi Viyogi, and Bhimsen. The landlady has very strict rules for all her tenants to wit: No one is allowed to romance on her property. On a rainy day when Pritam goes to buy milk, he runs into a beautiful girl, Neena Sharma, their umbrellas get entangled, and when freed get interchanged. He goes to look for her house and finds she lives with her maternal uncle, a music maestro of sorts, and Pritam enrolls himself in his class. Pritam and Neena continue meeting and fall in love with each other. When Neena's sister is about to get married, she travels to Poona and that's when Pritam finds out that her train had an accident and she has been listed as one of the dead. Heart-broken and devastated, he is severely depressed, until his co-workers decide that he should go for a picnic and this does cheer him considerably. In this cheerful state, he returns home and decides to carry on with life without Neena. It is then Neena returns, very much alive, and finds that Pritam is not in a state of mourning, but is enjoying life to the fullest. She decides to teach him a lesson that he will never forget. Watch what happens when the lesson commences and what impact this has on our care-free friend - who is currently wooing a dancer by the name of Edna Wong.

Cast
 Bhattacharya		
 Laxmi Chhaya...Bela
 Kalpana...Meena Sharma / Edna Wong
 Kamaldeep 		
 Tina Katkar 		
 Nand Kishore		
 Krishnakant...Kavi Viyogi
 Kishore Kumar...Pritam
 Kundan...Bhimsen
 Masood  		
 Pachhi 		
 Praveen Paul...Landlady
 Om Prakash...Vaidraj Churandas "Jari-Bhuti" Chaturvedi
 Madan Puri...R.L. Mathur "Matur"
 Rafia		
 Laxman Rao 		
 Kanu Roy 	 		
 Shivraj...Mr. Sharma
 Sunder...Jagdish
 Edwina...Dancer (uncredited)
 Marie...Dancer (uncredited)
 Shinde...Dancer (uncredited)

Soundtrack
For the first time, in this movie, Manna Dey sang for Kishore Kumar. Kishore Kumar, being extremely busy with acting at this point in his career, did not have time to record all his songs, hence other legendary Bollywood playback singers like Manna Dey, Mohammed Rafi and Mahendra Kapoor sang some songs filmed on him during this period.

Lyrics: Shailendra

 Ab Toh Batla Are Zalim

Singer(s): Kishore Kumar and Asha Bhosle

 Dil Dhadka Usse Dekhte Hi

Singer(s): Kishore Kumar

 Ho Gayi Shyam Dil Badnam

Singer(s): Manna Dey and Asha Bhosle

 Jahan Bhi Gaye Hum O Mere Humdam

Singer(s): Kishore Kumar and Asha Bhosle 

 Nazren Milake Jo Duniya Ki

Singer(s): Kishore Kumar

 Rang Yeh Duniya Badalti Hai

Singer(s): Kishore Kumar

 Sa Sa Sa Sa Re

Singer(s): Kishore Kumar and Asha Bhosle

 Tum Mere Pehchane Phir Bhi

Singer(s): Asha Bhosle

References

External links
 
 Naughty Boy at Fun Vills

1960s Hindi-language films
1962 films
Films directed by Shakti Samanta
Films scored by S. D. Burman
1962 romantic comedy films
Indian romantic comedy films